Sergeytsevo is a rural locality (a village) in Malyginskoye Rural Settlement, Kovrovsky District, Vladimir Oblast, Russia. The population was 140 as of 2010.

Geography 
Sergeytsevo is located 12 km west of Kovrov (the district's administrative centre) by road. Pakino is the nearest rural locality.

References 

Rural localities in Kovrovsky District